The 2021 La Roue Tourangelle Centre Val de Loire - Tropheé Harmonie Mutuelle was the 19th edition of the La Roue Tourangelle road cycling one day race, which was held on 4 April 2021, starting in the town of Sainte-Maure-de-Touraine and finishing in Tours. It was a category-1.1 event on the 2021 UCI Europe Tour and the third event of the 2021 French Road Cycling Cup. 

The race was won in a sprint by Arnaud Démare ahead of Nacer Bouhanni and Marc Sarreau.

Teams 
Four UCI WorldTeams, thirteen UCI ProTeams, and five UCI Continental teams made up the twenty-two teams that participated in the race. One team entered with six riders, two teams ( and ) entered with five, and all others entered with seven. 120 of the 149 riders in the race finished. 

UCI WorldTeams

 
 
 
 

UCI ProTeams

 
 
 
 
 
 
 
 
 
 
 
 
 

UCI Continental Teams

Result

References 

La Roue Tourangelle
La Roue Tourangelle
La Roue Tourangelle